James Riggs may refer to:
James M. Riggs (1839–1933), U.S. Representative from Illinois
Jim Riggs (born 1941), American saxophonist, retired professor of music
Jim Riggs (American football) (born 1963), American football player

See also 
James Harrison Rigg (1821–1909), English nonconformist minister